Bellamy Storer (March 26, 1796June 1, 1875) was a U.S. Representative from Ohio, father of Bellamy Storer (1847).

Born in Portland in Massachusetts' District of Maine, Storer attended private schools in his native city.  He entered Bowdoin College in Brunswick in 1809.  He studied law in Boston.  He was admitted to the bar in Portland in 1817 and commenced practice in Cincinnati, Ohio, the same year.

Storer was elected as an Anti-Jacksonian to the Twenty-fourth Congress (March 4, 1835 – March 3, 1837).  He declined to be a candidate for renomination in 1836 to the Twenty-fifth Congress, taking a job as a professor in Cincinnati Law School 1855–1874. He was a Whig Presidential elector in 1844 for Clay/Frelinghuysen. He was nominated by the Whigs in 1851 for the Ohio Supreme Court, but lost. He served as judge of the superior court of Cincinnati from its organization in 1854 until 1872, when he resigned.  He resumed the practice of law, and died in Cincinnati, Ohio, on June 1, 1875.  He was interred in Spring Grove Cemetery.

He was a trustee of Ohio University beginning in 1866. A bust of Storer was sculpted by Moses Jacob Ezekiel.

Sources

External links

 

1796 births
1875 deaths
Politicians from Portland, Maine
National Republican Party members of the United States House of Representatives from Ohio
Ohio Whigs
1844 United States presidential electors
Ohio state court judges
Judges of the Superior Court of Cincinnati
Politicians from Cincinnati
Ohio lawyers
Bowdoin College alumni
University of Cincinnati College of Law faculty
Ohio University trustees
Burials at Spring Grove Cemetery
19th-century American judges
19th-century American lawyers